Bustan-e Reyhaneh Metro Station is a station of Mashhad Metro Line 1. The station is on Parvaz Square, at the entrance of the airport property, and 2.5 km away from the terminal. The station provides access to Reyhaneh Park nearby, and is named after it. Originally it was to be called Parvaz Metro Station.

References

Mashhad Metro stations
Railway stations opened in 2011
2011 establishments in Iran